Mayakka Temple is a temple of Hindu worshiped goddess Mayakka Devi, who is worshipped by the different names such as Mahakali, Mayakarati, Mayavva etc. The temple is situated in Chinchali village of Raybag taluk in Belagavi district, Karnataka, India.

History
As per the records of 1881 year, it is said that the goddess Mayakka Devi hail from  Manadesh(Konkan area) of Maharashtra. The legend is that she came here chasing two demons named Leekila and Kattali and killed them at this place and settled here after that.

Fair
A fair is held yearly at the temple in the month of February and usually runs for a month. It includes chariot pulling, various sports competitions like bull race and several recreational events like circus, popular dramas and music concerts.

Trust
The temple trust was formed in the year 1998.

References

Hindu temples in Belagavi district